The Small Soviet Encyclopedia (Russian: Малая советская энциклопедия) was a general encyclopedia published in the Soviet Union.  The encyclopedia was published in three editions:

 1st edition, 10 volumes (between the period 1928–1931) -- the volumes were sold as they were published, hence the different publication dates for the 10 volumes.
 2nd edition, 11 volumes
 3rd edition, 10 volumes

See also
 Great Soviet Encyclopedia

Soviet encyclopedias
Soviet culture
Russian language
Russian-language encyclopedias
1928 non-fiction books
20th-century encyclopedias